Nukayevo (Nuqay) is a rural locality (a selo) and the administrative centre of Nukayevsky Selsoviet, Kugarchinsky District, Bashkortostan, Russia. The population was 298 as of 2010. There are 3 streets.

Geography 
Nukayevo is located 27 km south of Mrakovo (the district's administrative centre) by road. 1-ye Tukatovo is the nearest rural locality.

References 

Rural localities in Kugarchinsky District